Johann Ludwig Choulant (12 November 1791 – 18 July 1861) was a German physician and medical historian born in Dresden. He was the father of architect Ludwig Theodor Choulant (1827–1900).

He diagnosed medicine at the Collegium Medico-chirurgicum in Dresden and at the University of Leipzig, followed by work in 1817 as a physician/obstetrician in Altenburg. During the same year he joined the staff at the Medizinischen Realwörterbuch of Johann Friedrich Pierer (1767–1832). In 1821 he was a physician at the Königlichen Katholischen Krankenstift in Dresden-Friedrichstadt.

In 1822 he began work as a lecturer at the Königlich Chirurgisch-Medizinische Akademie (Royal Surgical-Medical Academy) in Dresden, where during the following year he became a professor of theoretical medicine. In 1828 he became a professor of practical medicine, and from 1843 to 1860 was rector of the Royal Surgical-Medical Academy. From 1844 onward, he served as medical officer in the Saxon Ministry of the Interior.

In addition to his work involving the literary history of medicine, Choulant made many contributions to the Saxon Medizinalordnung (medical code). In 1823 he began work as an associate editor of the journal Zeitschrift für Natur- und Heilkunde.

Written works 
 ''Bereicherungen für die Geburtshilfe, für die Physiologie und Pathologie des Weibes und Kindes. with Friedrich Ludwig Meissner (1796-1860), M. Küstner and Karl Friedrich Haase (1788-1865), (Enrichment for obstetrics, on the physiology and pathology of women and children); 1821.
 Tafeln zur Geschichte der Medizin (Tables on the history of medicine); 1822. 
 Lehrbuch der speziellen Pathologie und Therapie des Menschen (Textbook on special pathology and therapy of man); 1831. 
 Anleitung zur ärztlichen Rezeptierkunst (Manual for medical dispensing); second edition 1834.
 Anleitung zur ärztlichen Praxi (Guide to the medical practice); 1836.
 Handbuch der Bücherkunde für die ältere Medizin; second edition 1841. 
 Bibliotheca medico-historica; 1841. 
 Geschichte und Bibliographie der anatomischen Abbildung (History and bibliography of anatomic illustration); 1852. 
 »Die Anfänge wissenschaftlicher Naturgeschichte und naturhistorischer Abbildung im Abendland (The beginnings of scientific natural history and natural history illustration in the West); 1857.
 Graphische Inkunabeln für Naturgeschichte und Medizin (Graphical incunabula for natural history and medicine); 1858.

References 
 Pierer's Universal-Lexicon, Volume 4 Altenburg, 1858, p. 91 (biography, translated from German)
  Parts of the biography are based on a translation of an equivalent article at the German Wikipedia.

Physicians from Dresden
German medical historians
19th-century German physicians
1791 births
1861 deaths
German male non-fiction writers